Francisco Váldez (born 4 October 1900, date of death unknown) was a Peruvian middle-distance runner. He competed in the men's 800 metres at the 1936 Summer Olympics.

References

External links
 

1900 births
Year of death missing
Athletes (track and field) at the 1936 Summer Olympics
Peruvian male middle-distance runners
Olympic athletes of Peru
Place of birth missing
20th-century Peruvian people